Kelineh-ye Paydar (also Romanized as Kelīneh-ye Paydār and Kelīneh-ye Pāydār) is a village in Gurani Rural District, Gahvareh District, Dalahu County, Kermanshah Province, Iran. At the 2006 census, its population was 112, in 27 families.

References 

Populated places in Dalahu County